The 1925 Rutgers Queensmen football team was an American football team that represented Rutgers University as an independent during the 1925 college football season. In its second season under head coach John Wallace, the team compiled a 2–7 record and was outscored by a total of 146 to 38.

Schedule

References

Rutgers
Rutgers Scarlet Knights football seasons
Rutgers Queensmen football